Monkey Island is a series of adventure games.

Monkey Island may also refer to:

Places
 Nanwan Monkey Island, a nature reserve in Hainan, China
 Sarushima or Monkey Island, Japan
 Angaur or Monkey Island, Palau
 Monkey Island, Bray, in the River Thames
 Morgan Island, South Carolina or Monkey Island
 Monkey Island, North Carolina, a remote, natural island in Currituck Sound, North Carolina
 Monkey Island, Oklahoma, a peninsula in the Grand Lake o' the Cherokees in northeast Oklahoma
 Cayo Santiago or Island of the Monkeys, Puerto Rico
 Monkey Island, a monkey habitat on an island in the Homosassa River in Florida

Zoo enclosures
 Monkey Island, a division of the Cleveland Metroparks Zoo
 Monkey Island, an area that used to be in the San Francisco Zoo
 Monkey Island, an area that was at the entrance of the Oklahoma City Zoo and Botanical Gardens from 1935 to 1998

Other uses
 Monkey Island (album), a 1977 album by the J. Geils Band
 Monkey Island (book), a 1991 book about homelessness
 "Monkey Island", a 1966 song by the 13th Floor Elevators from The Psychedelic Sounds of the 13th Floor Elevators
 Monkey island, the flying bridge or open area on top of a surface ship